John 1:40 is the 40th verse in the first chapter of the Gospel of John in the New Testament of the Christian Bible.

Content
In the original Greek according to Westcott-Hort this verse is:
Ἦν Ἀνδρέας ὁ ἀδελφὸς Σίμωνος Πέτρου εἷς ἐκ τῶν δύο τῶν ἀκουσάντων παρὰ Ἰωάννου καὶ ἀκολουθησάντων αὐτῷ.  

In the King James Version of the Bible the text reads:
One of the two which heard John speak, and followed him, was Andrew, Simon Peter’s brother.

The New International Version translates the passage as:
Andrew, Simon Peter's brother, was one of the two who heard what John had said and who had followed Jesus.

Analysis
Lapide believes that this part was inserted to show how Peter, "the prince of the Apostles," was called. The verse shows Andrew's joy from conversing with Christ and his desire to bring his beloved brother to their divine calling. As Lapide says, "For as fire kindles fire, so does zeal kindle zeal."  MacEvilly notes that "He is here, by anticipation, called 'Simon Peter' which name Christ promised him later in verse 42."

Commentary from the Church Fathers
Chrysostom: "One of the two which heard John speak and followed Him was Andrew, Simon Peter’s brother. Why is the other name left out? Some say, because this Evangelist himself was that other. Others, that it was a disciple of no eminence, and that there was no use in telling his name any more than those of the seventy-two, which are omitted."

Alcuin: " Or it would seem that the two disciples who followed Jesus were Andrew and Philip."

References

External links
Other translations of John 1:40 at BibleHub

01:40